Carcamano is an ethnic slur used in Southern Brazil for the descendants of the non-Iberian European immigrants who arrived in Brazil in the late 19th century and in the early 20th century.

This name was originally given to the Italian-Brazilians, the largest non-Iberian European community in Brazil, but was slowly spread to other non-Iberian white Brazilian communities like German-Brazilians, Slavic-Brazilians and others. In some regions of Northeastern Brazil (especially the states of Maranhão and Ceará), this term is also used for Brazilian Jews and Arab Brazilians.

Folk etymology wrongly advocates that the word carcamano is composed of two separate words. Calca- drawn from the Italian verb calcare, which means "to press down" and -mano (IT) meaning "hand".  The idea was to refer to the foreigner, probably of Italian origin (whence mano, vs. Portuguese mão), of pressing down on the scales when weighing goods in the dry goods or grocery store. It is a way of calling the vendor a cheat. 

The real etymological base of the word is disputed. According to the Brazilian filologist Antenor Nascentes the most probable origin is the Spanish-language word carcamán, used in Latin America to denote "decrepit person" (in Perú), a poor foreigner (in Cuba), pretentious person with few merits (in Colombia) and Italians - in particular Italians from Liguria - (in Argentina).

References

Ethnic groups in Brazil
Ethnic groups in Latin America
Ethnic groups in the Americas
Ethno-cultural designations
Italian emigrants to Brazil
Italian-Brazilian culture
Portuguese words and phrases